Olı Qawal is a rural locality (a selo) in Biektaw District, Tatarstan. The population was 466 as of 2010.

Geography 
 is located 20 km northwest of Biektaw, district's administrative centre, and 35 km north of Qazan, republic's capital, by road.

History 
The village already existed during the period of the Qazan Khanate.

From 18th to the first half of the 19th centuries village's residents belonged to the social estate of state peasants.

By the beginning of the twentieth century, village had 2 mosques, a madrasa, a mekteb, 2 windmills, 3 watermills and 9 small shops.

Before the creation of the Tatar ASSR in 1920 was a part of Qazan Uyezd of Qazan Governorate. Since 1920 was a part of Arça Canton; after the creation of districts in Tatar ASSR (Tatarstan) in Döbyaz (1930–1963),  Yäşel Üzän (1963–1965) and Biektaw districts.

References

External links 
 

Rural localities in Vysokogorsky District